Dunn Brothers Coffee is a franchise company of coffeehouses founded in St. Paul, Minnesota, in December 1987 by brothers Ed and Dan Dunn. As of September 2022, Dunn Brothers Coffee has 57 locations throughout the country.

History 
The first store opened in 1987 at 1569 Grand Avenue in St. Paul, after the Dunn brothers had driven an old Dodge van loaded with their belongings from Portland, Oregon, to Minnesota in search of a good, underserved location for a coffee business. They found a refurbished 1950s Probat roaster in Cincinnati, Ohio, and used it to set up that first store. The second location opened in Uptown Minneapolis in 1991 (and was temporarily the only location while the Grand Avenue store was rebuilt following a 1991 fire). The Grand Avenue store still exists as "Dunn Bros Coffee" but is not part of the Dunn Brothers Coffee franchise.

On July 25, 2022, Dunn Brothers Coffee announced that it was acquired by Gala Capital Partners, owner of Cicis Pizza and Mooyah.

Franchise
The store's locations are primarily in the American Midwest, especially Minnesota, where there are 43 locations. As of 2021, the company has stores in Iowa, Missouri, Nebraska, North Dakota, South Dakota, Texas, and Wisconsin. Dunn Bros Coffee is a franchise, and most stores are locally owned and operated. One distinguishing feature that separates Dunn Bros from most of its chain competitors is that at every traditional location the coffee is roasted right in the store, usually on a daily basis. This allows customers to buy freshly roasted whole beans. The in-store roasting and small batch sizes typically allow for the availability of 12-15 varieties of whole beans.

Dunn Bros partners with certifiers of sustainably grown coffee in the world including Fair Trade USA, and Rainforest Alliance.

See also

 List of coffeehouse chains

References

External links
Official website
Dunn Bros Grand Avenue (independent)

Coffeehouses and cafés in the United States
Companies based in Minneapolis
Coffee brands